Athletics was one of the 26 sports contested at the 2019 Pacific Games hosted by Samoa. The track and field events were held at Apia Park on 15–20 July, with the half marathon staged on a course at the Apia waterfront on 20 July. Forty-nine athletics events were contested at the games, including six parasport events.

Participating nations
A total of 21 countries, nineteen Pacific Games Association members plus Australia and New Zealand, competed in athletics at the 2019 games. It was the first Pacific Games where track and field athletes from Australia and New Zealand had participated.

Note: A number shown in brackets is the size of the athletics contingent (excluding para-athletes) for each country.

Medal table
Papua New Guinea topped the medal table for athletics, retaining the position they won four years earlier. Fiji came in second while New Caledonia finished third. Host nation Samoa was ranked eighth with nine medals including one gold.

Medal summary

Men's results

Para events

Women's results
The pole vault event for women was not contested.

Para events

Notes
 Erwan Cassier dedicated his win to his late father, Frédéric Cassier, who won the title in Apia, in 1983.

 Toea Wisil broke the women's 100 metre games record in her first round heat clocking 11.50 seconds. The previous record was 11.55 seconds.

 The women's 3000m steeplechase only had 3 entries. Therefore according to the Samoa 2019 Athletics technical manual section 9.3, only gold and silver will be awarded in events with such cases.

See also
 Athletics at the Pacific Games

References
 

2019 Pacific Games
Athletics at the Pacific Games
Pacific Games